The Boston Demons is a United States Australian Football League team, based in Boston, United States. It was founded in 1997. They play in the Eastern Australian Football League.

USAFL premierships

1998

1999

2019

2022

Demons in International Cups 
The following Demons players have represented the United States men's national Australian rules football team, the USA Revolution, in an Australian Football International Cup:

See also

References

External links
 

Australian rules football clubs in the United States
Demons
Australian rules football clubs established in 1997
1997 establishments in Massachusetts